Lakshmi Shankar (née Sastri, 16 June 1926 – 30 December 2013) was an Indian singer and a noted Hindustani classical. Born into a south Indian Hindu family, she became an outstanding Hindustani vocalist of the Patiala Gharana and married Rajendra Shankar, brother of Uday Shankar, a Bengali by birth. She was known for her performances of khyal, thumri, and bhajan. She was the sister-in-law of sitar player Ravi Shankar and the mother-in-law of violinist L. Subramaniam (her daughter Viji (Vijayashree Shankar) Subramaniam being his first wife).

Biography
Born in 1921, Shankar started her career in dancing. Her father Bhimrao Shastri was a noted Sanskritist who took active participation in India's struggle for freedom and was a close associate of Mahatma Gandhi. She was the co-editor of 'Harijan'. In 1939, when Uday Shankar brought his dance troupe to Madras (recently renamed Chennai), she joined the Almora Centre to learn Shankar's dance style based on the Indian classics, and became a part of the troupe. In 1941, she married Uday Shankar's younger brother, Rajendra (nicknamed Raju). Her sister Kamala was also a dancer at Uday Shankar's ballet troupe. 

During a period of illness, Shankar had to give up dancing, and already having had a background of Carnatic music, she undertook learning Hindustani classical music for many years under Ustad Abdul Rehman Khan. Later, she also trained with Ravi Shankar, the sitar maestro and youngest brother of Rajendra and Uday.

In 1974, Shankar performed in Europe as part of Ravi Shankar's Music Festival from India. Late that same year, she toured North America with Shankar and George Harrison, who produced the Shankar Family & Friends album (1974), including the pop single "I Am Missing You" with vocals by Shankar. Following Ravi Shankar's heart attack during the tour, she conducted his ensemble of musicians.

Shankar has shown her versatility and adaptability by composing music for Bharatanatyam for the leading dance company Shakti School of Bharatanatyam, located in Los Angeles.

Shankar died on 30 December 2013 in California.

Discography 
LP records
 The Voice of Lakshmi Shankar – World Pacific, US, 1969
 Le chant indien, classique et dévotionnel – Stil discothèque, France, 1976
 Les Heures et les Saisons – Ocora, France, studio 107 de Radio France 1983, 1987
CDs
 Les Heures et les Saisons – Ocora, France, studio 107 de Radio France 1983, 1989
 Chants de dévotion / Songs of Devotion – Auvidis (Ethnic), France, 1990
 Live Concert from Los Angeles – Ravi Shankar Music Circle, US
 Jai Uttal Footprints, featuring Lakshmi Shankar and Don Cherry – Triloka, Los Angeles, California, US, 1990
 Live in London – Navras, UK
 Bhakti Ras (Live in London, Vol. 2, September 1992) – Navras, UK, 1995
 Shringar: Thumris – Music Today, India
 Ecstasy – Audiorec, 1991
 Amrut Ras, Lakshmi Shankar sings songs from the devotional tradition – Audiorec Classics UK (Cat No 766032 1055-2), 2003
 Divine Love – Navras UK, 2005, 2006
 A life of dedication – Navras UK, 2006, 2006
 Dancing in the Light – World Village, recorded live, 9 April 2005 at On the Path Studio, Santa Monica, California, US, 2008
Cassettes
 Live in London – Navras, UK
 Bhakti Ras – Navras, UK
 Songs of the Seasons – Music Today, India
 Shringar: Thumris – Music Today, India
 Thumris – HMV – India
 Lakshmi Shankar Vocal with Zakir Hussain and L. Subramaniam – HMV, India

References

External links
 Interview with Lakshmi Shankar
 
 
 Lakshmi Shankar at Last.fm

1926 births
2013 deaths
Hindustani singers
Singers from Chennai
Place of birth missing
Indian women classical singers
Patiala gharana
20th-century Indian singers
Women Hindustani musicians
20th-century Indian women singers
Women musicians from Tamil Nadu
20th-century Khyal singers